The Liberal Students of Norway (often: NLSF and Liberale Studenter) is the political student organization of the Norwegian Liberal Party (Venstre), with chapters in the major university cities of Oslo, Bergen, Trondheim and Ås. It was founded in 1908, making it one of Norway's oldest student organizations.

The organization's name has changed several times. Originally named Social-radikale studenterforening (1908-1911), it has used other names such as Studentenes Venstreforening (1911-1924), Studentenes Venstrelag and Studentvenstrelaget.

NLSF used to publish the magazines Epoke (1947 - ?) and then Liberalt Perspektiv.

History 
There has previously been Den frisinnede studenterforening which is already mentioned in 1880. A delegation from Studentenes Venstreforening is also mentioned to have participated in a conference in Uppsala in 1901.

The current organization was founded in 1908 under the name Social-radikale studenterforening. The student society of Oslo was then led by the conservative C. J. Hambro and refused to pass a resolution condemning students who were breaking a strike among harbor workers. A committee led by Wilhelm Keilhau sought to gather all the "academical citizens who want radical policies in social matters". Ole Solnørdal was elected president under the constitutive assembly on the 27th of November 1908. 

Studentenes Venstrelag contributed to the revival of Unge Venstre, Venstre's youth wing from 1920 to 1926. It functioned in 1936 as an affiliate of both the youth and mother organization.

The Trondheim chapter is founded in 1946-1947. The Bergen chapter is founded during the first half of the 1950s, it temporarily dissolved in 1970-1971 and transformed into the unaffiliated Populistiske Arbeidsgrupper.

Chairpersons 

* Mari Evenrud and Magne Leirheim assumed the interim chairmanship due to Knudsen's disease

** Håkon Nygaard assumed the interim chairmanship during Gjemdal's military service
 Torgeir Anda ?–1979
 Anita Haugland ca. 1987
 Grete Line Simonsen 1991–?
 Morten Hagen 1995–1996
 Per Aage Pleym Christensen 1996–?

References 

In-line:

General:

External links 

 Official website

Student wings of political parties in Norway
Student wings of liberal parties